Lacertaspis reichenowii is a species of lizard in the family Scincidae. It is named after Anton Reichenow, German ornithologist.

Lacertaspis reichenowii is endemic to Central Africa and is known from Cameroon, the Central African Republic, the Democratic Republic of the Congo, Bioko (Equatorial Guinea), and Gabon. It occurs in lowland tropical moist forest.

References

Lacertaspis
Skinks of Africa
Reptiles of Cameroon
Reptiles of the Central African Republic
Reptiles of the Democratic Republic of the Congo
Reptiles of Equatorial Guinea
Reptiles of Gabon
Reptiles described in 1874
Taxa named by Wilhelm Peters